Judith Barrett (born Lucille Kelley, February 2, 1909 – March 10, 2000), also known as Nancy Dover, was an American film actress of the late 1920s and through the 1930s, up until 1940.

Early life
Born and raised in Venus, Texas, Barrett was one of three children of a cattle rancher Sam Kelley.

Barrett made several appearances at The Palace Theatre, Dallas while still at school.  She did modeling at a department store for ladies tea/fashion shows.

Career
At sixteen, she got on a train to Hollywood. Her first big chance came when she started in a lavish commercial film in 1928, The Sock Exchange opposite Bobby Vernon. In 1929 she starred in five films, and made a successful transition to "talking films". From 1928 to 1933 she was billed as "Nancy Dover", and from 1930 to 1933 she appeared in nine films, all credited.

In 1933, she appeared in only one film, Marriage Humor opposite Harry Langdon and Vernon Dent, while doing stage work. She would not have another role until 1936, when she starred in the crime drama Yellowstone opposite Henry Hunter, and alongside Ralph Morgan and Alan Hale. It was the first film that she was billed as "Judith Barrett". She appeared in two films that year, and five in 1937, one of which was her first uncredited role.

From 1938 to 1940, Barrett appeared in ten films, all credited, including Road to Singapore, the first "road" picture by the team of Bing Crosby and Bob Hope. Barrett retired from film acting following her appearance in the 1940 comedy Those Were the Days!, starring William Holden and Bonita Granville.

Telegenic
Noted for her beauty, the October 16, 1939 edition of the Baltimore Sun said of her: "Judith Barrett, pretty and blonde actress, is the first Telegenic Girl to go on record. In other words, she is the perfect type of beauty for television. ... She is slated for the first television motion picture." The Salt Lake Tribune noted that Barrett was "selected after months of exhaustive tests by television experts, sound engineers, photographers and make-up specialists." Paramount Pictures followed up on the selection by featuring her in its film, Television Spy (1939).

Personal life
In March 1940, Barrett married Lindsay C. Howard in Yuma, Arizona. They divorced on April 8, 1952. She had earlier been married to actor Cliff Edwards.

She eventually settled in Palm Desert, California, where she was residing at the time of her death at the age of 91 on March 10, 2000. She had two children with Howard and the marriage ended in divorce.

Filmography

References

External links

American silent film actresses
American film actresses
People from Arlington, Texas
Actresses from Texas
1909 births
2000 deaths
20th-century American actresses